Tommy Paul won the title after defeating Tennys Sandgren 6–3, 6–4 in the final.

Hugo Dellien was the defending champion but lost in the third round to Aslan Karatsev.

Seeds
All seeds receive a bye into the second round.

Draw

Finals

Top half

Section 1

Section 2

Bottom half

Section 3

Section 4

References

External links
Main draw
Qualifying draw

Sarasota Open - Singles
2019 Singles